BTS Group Holdings Public Company Limited (BTSG), formerly known as Tanayong Public Company Limited, is a public company in Thailand. It is the majority share holder of Bangkok Mass Transit System PCL (BTSC), the operator of the BTS Skytrain and the Bangkok BRT.

Businesses
BTSG does business in four main areas: mass transit (through the Bangkok Mass Transit System Public Company Limited), media/advertising (through VGI Global Media), property/real estate (through property developer U City and hotel operator U Hotels & Resorts), and associated service businesses. BTSG has holdings in 57 subsidiaries, jointly controlled companies, or associated firms.

Financials
BTSG's fiscal year runs from 1 April to 31 March. For fiscal year 2017-2018 (1 April 2017 – 31 March 2018), BTS Holdings reported 17,915 million baht in total revenues, total assets of 106,058 million baht, net income of 4,790 million baht, and total equity of 46,355 million baht. As of 31 March 2018 it employed 4,518 persons. Its 14-person board of directors was remunerated 29 million baht. Its eight executives were given 92 million baht in monetary compensation, not including stock warrants.

BTSG's four business units—mass transit, media, property, and services—contributed 65 percent, 28 percent, four percent, and three percent to group operating revenues respectively.

References

Transport companies of Thailand
Transport companies established in 1968
Companies based in Bangkok
1968 establishments in Thailand
Conglomerate companies of Thailand
Companies listed on the Stock Exchange of Thailand